Lucinda Jenney (born April 23, 1954) is an American actress.

Early life
Jenney was born in Long Island City in 1954.

Career 
She began her acting career in 1979 with the film Impostors. Several roles followed throughout the 1980s, with appearances in the 1986 comedy The Whoopee Boys, and the award-winning Peggy Sue Got Married, with Kathleen Turner and Nicolas Cage. She appeared as 'Iris' in the Oscar-winning film Rain Man, starring Dustin Hoffman and Tom Cruise.

In 1991, Jenney played waitress 'Lena' in Ridley Scott's Thelma & Louise; the following year, she appeared in American Heart, a film which earned her an Independent Spirit Award for Best Supporting Female. Jenney played the role of 'Anne Loomis' in the Joe Dante comedy Matinee, with John Goodman and Cathy Moriarty. During the nineties, she appeared in much smaller roles including Mr. Jones with Richard Gere, and Leaving Las Vegas, with Nicolas Cage and Elisabeth Shue, as well as Grace of My Heart.

In 1996, she had a supporting role in the Tom Holland's horror film Thinner, which was based on the book by Stephen King. She also starred as medical officer Lieutenant Blondell in G.I. Jane, with Demi Moore, Mad City, with Dustin Hoffman and John Travolta, Desert Blue, with Kate Hudson and Christina Ricci, Practical Magic, with Sandra Bullock and Nicole Kidman and The Deep End of the Ocean, which starred Michelle Pfeiffer and was based on the book by Jacquelyn Mitchard.

In 2000, Jenney portrayed Helen O'Donnell in Thirteen Days. She then appeared in romantic drama Crazy/Beautiful, with Kirsten Dunst and The Mothman Prophecies, starring Richard Gere. Jenney's has appeared in other roles in S.W.A.T., American Violet and Rogue River. In 2009, she made a cameo appearance in The Hangover.

Jenney has had a successful career in television. Several of her television credits include guest roles in Miami Vice, The Practice, Judging Amy, The West Wing, 24, Law & Order, its spin-offs Law & Order: Criminal Intent and Law & Order: LA, Crossing Jordan, Six Feet Under, House, CSI: Crime Scene Investigation, ER, Monk, and portrayed Admiral Adama's wife, Carolanne on Battlestar Galactica, in the episode "A Day in the Life".

Jenney has appeared in many television films throughout her career. Her first was Out of the Darkness, with Martin Sheen. Some of her roles include Shoot First: A Cop's Vengeance, The Habitation of Dragons, A Stranger in Town, First Time Felon, the Emmy Award-winning If These Walls Could Talk 2, and The Pennsylvania Miners' Story.

Filmography

References

External links

1954 births
American film actresses
American television actresses
American voice actresses
Living people
Actresses from New York City
People from Long Island City, Queens
20th-century American actresses
21st-century American actresses